Rochon may refer to:

People

Charles Rochon (1673 - 1733) Founder of Mobile, Alabama
Rosette Rochon (1766 - 1863) Free woman of color, real estate investor 
Gilbert L. Rochon, 6th president of Tuskegee University
Stephen W. Rochon, former Director of the Executive Residence and White House Chief Usher
Victor Rochon, Great grandfather of Valerie Jarrett
Henri Rochon (1924–2005), Canadian national tennis champion
Debbie Rochon (born 1968), Canadian actress, known for independent horror movies and counter-culture film
Jean Rochon (1938–2021), Canadian politician
John Rochon, Canadian shooter
Lela Rochon, American actress
Alexis-Marie de Rochon
David Rochon, 2022 Brae Burn Country Club Golf Tournament Runner-Up

Places
Rochon Sands, a summer village on Buffalo Lake in central Alberta, Canada
Rochon Sands Provincial Park, a provincial park near the summer village